Bastard is a 1997 Polish-German-French drama film directed by Maciej Dejczer. The film contains a popular music theme Elena's Dance ("Taniec Eleny") composed by Michał Lorenc.

Cast

References

External links 

1997 films
1997 drama films
German drama films
French drama films
English-language German films
English-language French films
Films set in Romania
Films about orphans
Films scored by Michał Lorenc
Polish drama films
1990s English-language films
1990s French films
1990s German films